Megachile cestifera is a species of bee in the family Megachilidae. It was described by Benoist in 1954.

References

Cestifera
Insects described in 1954